Paul Wayland Bartlett (January 24, 1865 – September 20, 1925) was an American sculptor working in the Beaux-Arts tradition of heroic realism.

Life
Bartlett was born in New Haven, Connecticut, the son of Truman Howe Bartlett, an art critic and sculptor.

At fifteen he began to study in Paris under Emmanuel Frémiet, modelling from animals in the Jardin des Plantes. He won a medal at the Paris Salon of 1887, and was elected as a member of the jury for the Paris Exposition Universelle of 1889 and again at the Exposition of 1900, each time sacrificing his own opportunities of receiving medals. He was 29 when the Cross of a Chevalier of the Legion of Honor was bestowed upon him. In 1903, he collaborated with the dean of American sculptors, John Quincy Adams Ward, on the models for the pediment sculptures of the New York Stock Exchange; the pediment figures were carved by the Piccirilli Brothers.

Bartlett's masterwork was the House of Representatives pediment at the U.S. Capitol building, The Apotheosis of Democracy, begun in 1908 and completed in 1916.  Among his other principal works are Bohemian Bear Tamer, in the Metropolitan Museum of Art, New York; the equestrian statue of Lafayette, in the Cours Albert 1er, Paris, presented to the French Republic by the schoolchildren of America; the powerful and virile bronzes Columbus''' and Michelangelo inside the Library of Congress; the Ghost Dancer, in the Pennsylvania Academy, Philadelphia; the Dying Lion; the equestrian statue of McClellan in Philadelphia; and a statue of Joseph Warren in Boston, Massachusetts. His bronze patinas of reptiles, insects and fish, several of which are in the collection of the Berkshire Museum, are also remarkable.

In 1895, he was named a Chevalier of the French Legion of Honor.  In 1916 he was admitted to the American Academy of Arts and Letters. He was also a member of the National Sculpture Society and the International Society of Sculptors, Painters and Gravers.

In the mid-20th century, Bartlett’s step-daughter, Caroline Ogden-Jones Peter  worked to ensure that examples of Bartlett’s sculpture were distributed to museums throughout the United States. Additional examples of his sculpture, including many plaster studies as well as his personal papers are found at Tudor Place, Caroline's former home with husband, Armistead Peter 3rd; a historic house museum open to the public since 1988.

A retrospective exhibition was held after his death,  Paul Wayland Bartlett (1865—1925): sculptures, Musée de l'Orangerie, Paris, 1929.

See also
 Eternal Light Flagstaff''

References

Attribution

External links
Paul Wayland Bartlett papers, 1887-1925 from the Smithsonian Archives of American Art
Suzanne Bartlett papers relating to Paul W. Bartlett, (ca. 1883-1950s) from the Archives of American Art
 

1865 births
1925 deaths
American expatriates in France
Artists from New Haven, Connecticut
Chevaliers of the Légion d'honneur
20th-century American sculptors
20th-century American male artists
19th-century American sculptors
19th-century American male artists
American male sculptors
Sculptors from Connecticut
Members of the American Academy of Arts and Letters